The fluorosulfates or fluorosulfonates are a set of salts of fluorosulfuric acid with an ion formula SO3F−. The fluorosulfate anion can be treated as though it were a hydrogen sulfate anion with hydroxyl substituted by fluorine. The fluorosulfate ion has a low propensity to form complexes with metal cations. Since fluorine is similar in size to oxygen, the fluorosulfate ion is roughly tetrahedral and forms salts similar to those of the perchlorate ion.  It is isoelectronic with hydrogen sulfate, . When an organic group is substituted for the anions, organic fluorosulfonates are formed.

In solution the fluorosulfate anion is completely ionised. The volume of the ions is 47.8 cm3/mol. Most metal ions, and quaternary ammonium ions, can form fluorosulfate salts. Different ways to make these salts include treating a metal chloride with anhydrous fluorosulfuric acid, which releases hydrogen chloride gas. Double decomposition methods utilising a metal sulfate with barium fluorosulfate, or a metal chloride with silver fluorosulfate, leave the metal salt in solution.

The fluorosulfate anion is weakly coordinating, and is difficult to oxidise. It is important historically as a model weakly coordinating anion. However, by the twenty-first century fluorosulfate was superseded in this use, in particular by BARF.

Many pseudobinary fluorosulfate salts are known.  They are called pseudobinary, because although there is one other element, there are four kinds of atoms. Nonmetal pseudobinary fluorosulfates are known including those of halogens and xenon.

Some pseudoternary fluorosulfates exist including Cs[Sb(SO3F)6], Cs[Au(SO3F)4], Cs2[Pt(SO3F)6]

Related ionic compounds are the fluoroselenites SeO3F− and the fluorosulfites SO2F−. The sulfate fluorides are distinct, as they contain fluoride ions without a bond to the sulfate groups.

One fluorosulfate containing mineral called reederite-(Y) exists. It is a mixed anion compound that also contains carbonate and chloride.

Compounds

References

Fluorine compounds
Sulfur oxyanions